Palayur Mahadeva Temple was a legendary temple located in Palayoor near Chavakkad in the Thrissur district in ancient Kerala.
 This Shiva temple was later converted into a Christian church with the arrival of St. Thomas in Malabar, Kerala.  
 
Palayoor Mahadeva (Siva) Temple does not exist today.  The temple is believed to be constructed by the first Chera king of Kodungallur. This temple is one among the 108 Shiva temples established by Parasurama. The legends suggest that the installation of the idol of god Mahadeva (Shiva) was performed by Parasurama himself.

Legend 
Palayur was the stronghold of the Brahmins. When St. Thomas arrived from Kodungallur, Jews had a settlement at Palayur, two thousand years ago. Ruins of an ancient Jewish synagogue are still seen outside of a temple about a furlong away from the Church.  The origin of Christians in Kerala dates back to AD 52 when St. Thomas landed at the port of Kodungalloor. He visited various parts of Kerala and converted the natives including Namboothiri.

References 

108 Shiva Temples
Shiva temples in Kerala